This article lists common abbreviations for grammatical terms that are used in linguistic interlinear glossing of oral languages in English.

The list provides conventional glosses as established by standard inventories of glossing abbreviations such as the Leipzig Glossing rules, the most widely known standard. These will generally be the glosses used on Wikipedia. Synonymous glosses are listed as alternatives for reference purposes. In a few cases, long and short standard forms are listed, intended for texts where that gloss is rare or common.

Conventions 

 Grammatical abbreviations are generally written in full or small caps to visually distinguish them from the translations of lexical words. For instance, capital or small-cap  (frequently abbreviated to ) glosses a grammatical past-tense morpheme, while lower-case 'past' would be a literal translation of a word with that meaning. Similarly, (small) cap  might be a locative suffix used in nominal inflections, prototypically indicating direction downward but possibly also used where it is not translatable as 'down' in English, whereas lower-case 'down' would be a direct English translation of a word meaning 'down'. Not all authors follow this convention.
 Person-number-gender is often further abbreviated, in which case the elements are not small caps.
This helps keep the gloss graphically aligned with the parsed text when the abbreviations are longer than the morphemes they gloss. Such shortened forms may be ambiguous with other authors or texts are so are not presented as normative here. At the extreme, glosses may not be abbreviated at all but simply written in small caps, e.g. Such long, obvious abbreviationse.g. in  have been omitted from the list below, but are always possible.
A morpheme will sometimes be used as its own gloss. This is typically done when it is the topic of discussion, and the author wishes it to be immediately recognized in the gloss among other morphemes with similar meanings, or when it has multiple or subtle meanings that would be impractical to gloss with a single conventional abbreviation. This is also seen when the meaning of a morpheme is debated, and glossing it one way or another would prejudice the discussion. 
Lexical morphemes are typically translated, using lower-case letters, though they may be given a grammatical gloss in small caps if they play a grammatical role in the text. Exceptions include proper nouns, which typically are not translated, and kinship terms, which may be too complex to translate. Proper nouns/names may simply be repeated in the gloss, or may be replaced with a placeholder such as "(name.)" or "" (for a female name). For kinship glosses, see the dedicated section below for a list of standard abbreviations.
Lehmann recommends that abbreviations for syntactic roles not be used as glosses for arguments, as they are not morphological categories.

Glosses for generic concepts like 'particle', 'infix', 'tense', 'object marker' and the like are generally to be avoided in favor of specifying the precise value of the morpheme. However, they may be appropriate for historical linguistics or language comparison, where the value differs between languages or a meaning cannot be reconstructed, or where such usage is unambiguous because there is only a single morpheme (e.g. article or aspect marker) that can be glossed that way. Such pseudo-glossing may be difficult for the reader to follow. 
Authors also use placeholders for generic elements in schematicized parsing, such as may be used to illustrate morpheme or word order in a language. These are not listed below as they are not glosses for morphological values.

Lists 
Nonabbreviated English words used as glosses are not included in the list below.

For example,  is not listed, as it is composable from  + . This convention is grounded in the Leipzig Glossing Rules. Some authors use a lower-case n, for example  for 'non-human'.

Some sources are moving from classical lative terminology to 'directional', with concommitant changes in the abbreviations. Other authors contrast -lative and -directive.

Some sources use alternative abbreviations to distinguish e.g. nominalizer from nominalization, or shorter abbreviations for compounded glosses in synthetic morphemes than for independent glosses in agglutinative morphemes. These are seldom distinct morphosyntactic categories in a language, though some may be distinguished in historical linguistics. They are not distinguished below, as any such usage tends to be idiosyncratic to the author.

Punctuation and numbers

Grammatical abbreviations

Kinship
It is common to abbreviate grammatical morphemes but to translate lexical morphemes. However, kin relations commonly have no precise translation, and in such cases they are often glossed with anthropological abbreviations. Most of these are transparently derived from English; an exception is 'Z' for 'sister'. (In anthropological texts written in other languages, abbreviations from that language will typically be used, though sometimes the single-letter abbreviations of the basic terms listed below are seen.) A set of basic abbreviations is provided for nuclear kin terms (father, mother, brother, sister, husband, wife, son, daughter); additional terms may be used by some authors, but because the concept of e.g. 'aunt' or 'cousin' may be overly general or may differ between communities, sequences of basic terms are often used for greater precision. There are two competing sets of conventions, of one-letter and two-letter abbreviations:

These are concatenated, e.g. MFZS = MoFaSiSo 'mother's father's sister's son', yBWF = yBrWiFa 'younger brother's wife's father'. 'Elder/older' and 'younger' may affix the entire string, e.g. oFaBrSo (an older cousin – specifically father's brother's son), MBDy (a younger cousin – specifically mother's brother's daughter) or a specific element, e.g. MFeZS 'mother's father's elder sister's son', HMeB 'husband's mother's elder brother'.

'Gen' indicates the generation relative to the ego, with ∅ for the same (zero) generation. E.g. Gen∅Ch (child of someone in the same generation, i.e. of a sibling or cousin); ♂Gen+1F (female one generation up, i.e. mother or aunt, of a male); Gen−2M (male two generations down, i.e. grandson or grandnephew).

'Cross' and 'parallel' indicate a change or lack of change in gender of siblings in the chain of relations. Parallel aunts and uncles are MoSi and FaBr; cross-aunts and uncles are FaSi and MoBr. Cross-cousins (+Cu) and parallel cousins (∥Cu) are children of the same. Parallel niece and nephew are children of a man's brother or woman's sister; cross-niece and nephew are the opposite. 'Elder' and 'younger' occurs before these markers: o∥Cu, y+Cu, and the gender of the ego comes at the very beginning, e.g. ♂o∥CuF, ♀y+CuM.

Literature 
 Leipzig Glossing Rules
 Payne, Thomas E. 1997. Describing Morphosyntax.
 Summary of case forms:

Notes

References 

Linguistics lists
Lists of abbreviations